Mecosarthron is a genus of beetles in the family Cerambycidae, containing the following species:

 Mecosarthron buphagus Buquet, 1840
 Mecosarthron gounellei (Lameere, 1903)
 Mecosarthron tritomegas Lameere, 1920

References

Prioninae